Miandehi or Miyandehi or Meyandehi may refer to:
 Miandehi, Fariman
 Miandehi, Mahvelat